Suhani Dhanki is an Indian dancer and television actress. Suhani is best known for her portrayal of Madri in Mahabharat on Star Plus.

She played the role of a pirate princess, Laachi, in Swastik Productions' Porus.

She is also a trained Bharatnatyam dancer, disciple of Dr Sandhya Purecha.  

In 2017, she married Prathmesh Mody.

Television

Awards

References

External links 

Living people
Indian television actresses
Indian soap opera actresses
Actresses in Hindi television
21st-century Indian actresses
Year of birth missing (living people)